Brazil competed at the 1968 Summer Olympics in Mexico City, Mexico. 76 competitors, 73 men and 3 women, took part in 27 events in 13 sports. Brazilians won three medals at 1968 Summer Olympics. The bronze medal obtained by sailors Reinaldo Conrad and Burkhard Cordes and the bronze medal won by boxer Servílio de Oliveira were the first medals in their sports. Nelson Prudêncio obtained a silver medal and carried on the nation's tradition of good results in Men's Triple Jump.

Medalists

Athletics

Men
Field events

Women
Field events

Combined events – Pentathlon

Basketball

Preliminary round

Group B

Semifinal

Bronze medal

Boxing

Men

Equestrian

Show jumping

Fencing

Four fencers, all men, represented Brazil in 1968.
 Men
Ranks given are within the pool.

Football

First round

Group B

Rowing

Men

Sailing

Open

Shooting

Two male shooters represented Brazil in 1968.
Men

Swimming

Men

Volleyball

Men's Team Competition

|}

|}

Water polo

Preliminary round

Group A

14 October 1968

15 October 1968

19 October 1968

20 October 1968

21 October 1968

22 October 1968

Weightlifting

Men

References

External links
Official Olympic Reports
International Olympic Committee results database

Nations at the 1968 Summer Olympics
1968
olympics